Carinocranium cariniferum is a species of asaphid trilobites of the family Raphiophoridae that lived during the Early Tremadocian of Alberta, Canada. It is known only from a cranidium with a large, keel-shaped glabellum.

Etymology 
The generic and specific epithets both refer to the massive, keel-shaped glabellum, thus the use of the Latin prefix "", so that the generic epithet translates as "keel-cranium," and the specific epithet translating as "keel bearing."

Occurrence 
The only known specimen, specimen GSC 62139, is found in the Early Tremadocian-aged GSC Locality 92293, 168.5 meters above the Outram Formation, Alberta, Canada.

References 

Asaphida
Ordovician trilobites of North America
Fossils of Canada